Chilelopsis puertoviejo is a species of mygalomorph spiders of Chile, named after its type locality: Puerto Viejo, Copiapó, Region III. The species is most similar to C. calderoni, but differs in having the distal portion of the male bulbal duct less sinuous and the female spermathecae of uniform width, with no differentiated fundus. It differs from C. serena in the undivided female spermathecae and the male tibia I having a dense apical patch of setae.

Description
Female: total length ; cephalothorax length , width ; cephalic region length , width ; fovea width ; medial ocular quadrangle length , width ; labium length , width ; sternum length , width . Its cephalic region is short and wide, with the fovea slightly procurved. Its labium possesses no cuspules; serrula is absent. Its well marked sternal sigilla is shallow, small and oval. Chelicerae: rastellum is formed by thin, long and stiff setae. Color as in C. calderoni.
Male: total length ; cephalothorax length , width ; cephalic region length , width ; labium length , width ; sternum length , width . Its labium possesses 2 cuspules. Its serrula has some small denticles present. Its sternal sigilla is shallow, small and oval. Chelicerae: rastellum is absent, with long, thin and stiff setae. Cheliceral tumescence is rounded and flat, covered with short, thin setae. Its leg I and tibial apophysis are absent, with a shield of setae on the anteroventral apex. Its metatarsus is evenly curved. Color as in C. calderoni.

Distribution
Sand dunes in Regions III (Atacama Region) and IV (Coquimbo Region).

See also
Spider anatomy
List of Nemesiidae species
Regions of Chile

References

External links

ADW entry

Nemesiidae
Spiders of South America
Spiders described in 1995
Endemic fauna of Chile